The Arequipa Peru Temple is a temple of the Church of Jesus Christ of Latter-day Saints (LDS Church) in Arequipa, Peru.

History
The intent to construct the temple was announced by church president Thomas S. Monson on 6 October 2012, during his remarks opening the LDS Church's 182nd Semiannual General Conference. The temple was announced concurrently with the Tucson Arizona Temple. When announced, this increased the total number of temples worldwide to 168 and the number in Peru to three.

On 4 March 2017, a groundbreaking ceremony to signify beginning of construction took place with Carlos A. Godoy presiding. On 21 May 2019, the LDS Church announced the public open house that was then held from 15 November through 30 (except for Sundays). The temple was dedicated on 15 December 2019 by Ulisses Soares.

In 2020, the Arequipa Peru Temple was closed temporarily during the year in response to the coronavirus pandemic.

See also

 List of temples of The Church of Jesus Christ of Latter-day Saints
 List of temples of The Church of Jesus Christ of Latter-day Saints by geographic region
 The Church of Jesus Christ of Latter-day Saints in Peru

References

External links
Arequipa Peru Temple Official site
Arequipa Peru Temple at ChurchofJesusChristTemples.org

Temples (LDS Church) in Peru
Churches in Arequipa
21st-century Latter Day Saint temples
Temples (LDS Church) completed in 2019